The Reason Party is an Australian political party founded in 2017. Its leader, Fiona Patten, describes the party as a "civil libertarian alternative". Patten was elected to the Victorian Legislative Council as at the 2018 state election in the Northern Metropolitan Region, after formerly being elected as a Sex Party member for the same seat in the 2014 state election.

Reason is registered at the state level in Victoria, and as a Federal party.

History 
In August 2017, Fiona Patten announced the launch of a new Federal party called Reason Australia that in part was borne from a merger of the Australian Sex Party and the Australian Cyclists Party. In January 2018, the Victorian Electoral Commission officially changed the party's name from "Australian Sex Party – Victoria" to "Reason Victoria".

In May 2018, the party applied to the AEC for registration for federal elections as "Reason Australia", which was approved on 30 August 2018.

In December 2019, the NSW branch of the Voluntary Euthanasia Party merged with the Reason Party, and changed its name to "Reason Party NSW".

In December 2020 it was announced that Patten would enter a coalition with independent Mildura MP, Ali Cupper who sits in the Legislative Assembly. Cupper ended the agreement on 13 May 2021.

In February 2022, Jane Caro announced that she was standing as a candidate for the party for a New South Wales Australian Senate seat in the 2022 Australian federal election.

Parliamentary actions
The party's main goal should they be elected was to establish voluntary assisted dying laws for Victoria. After a long process and a marathon legislative session, the bill became law on a conscience vote.

In 2017, Patten renewed calls for a pilot program of a safe injecting room in North Richmond, in response to a large increase of Victorian drug-related deaths in the last several years. In the first session for the Legislative Council of the year, she introduced the Drugs, Poisons and Controlled Substances Amendment (Pilot Medically Supervised Injecting Centre) Bill 2017. At the time there were regular overdoses in the streets of Richmond, and that number has been reduced significantly since the centre was opened, with various estimates about the number of lives saved due to the opening of the centre.

Policies

The party's policies include:

Drug law reform 
 Drug use to be treated as a health issue, not a criminal one
 Cannabis to be legalised, regulated and taxed 
 Trial hydromorphone (analogue of heroin) on prescription  
 Increase in medically supervised injecting centres
 Electronic vaporisers and liquid nicotine should be legalised 
 Pill testing at every music festival

Cannabis
In regards to cannabis the party supports the following:

 The legalisation and regulation of cannabis for people over the age of 18
 Support for the legal possession and use of cannabis for people over the age of 18
 Amending drug driving laws to test for impairment not presence
 The cultivation of a defined number of plants in their principal place of residence
 Regulations that allow for the establishment of cannabis social clubs
 Establishing a regulatory body to oversee the industry
 Regulation on the potency of THC in legal cannabis products
 Market controls to avoid the creation of a ‘Big Cannabis’ industry
 Restrictions on advertising, marketing and promotion products
 Competitive pricing to undercut the illicit market
 An appropriate tax framework to help fund cannabis related programs
 Expunging all historical personal-use cannabis criminal records

Tax and churches 
 Remove tax exemptions from businesses owned by religious institutions, while protecting their charitable activities
 Prevent religious organisations from discriminating by reforming anti-discrimination laws
 Religious oaths to be removed from parliamentary proceedings
 Extend mandatory reporting laws to religious institutions and end exemptions for admissions disclosed in religious confessions

Social housing 
 Encourage build-to-rent and rent-to-buy schemes and remove tax barriers 
Stamp Duty to be reduced from investments in social housing

Gambling 
 Setting a maximum bet limit for poker machines and limiting the influence of the pokies industry

Health 
 Vaccination to protect public health and reduce the spread of preventable diseases
Establishment of health hubs 
 Early intervention and evidence-based prevention are the main focus 
 Create an ombudsman for aged care and retirement housing, and establish a statewide ageing strategy

Internet and media 
 Expand free wifi in public spaces including on all public transport
 Anti-ISP filtering
 National media classification and introduction of non-violent sexual content label

Other areas 

 Focusing on community housing and ensuring that at-risk people have a place to live
 Decriminalise sex work and remove censorship so that people can make their own choices about what they want to watch
 Improving public transport especially for high growth outer suburban areas
 Increasing oversight around politicians and tighten the rules to prevent unethical behaviour by the state's politicians and public figures
 Taxing the non-charitable business arms of religious institutions. This includes the estimated $9 billion portfolio of the Catholic Church in the state
 Holding a referendum on whether or not Australia should become a republic
 A nationwide trial of a four-day workweek
 Provide improved, interconnected and safer walking and cycling paths, including:
 Investment in safe, direct and continuous bike routes, separated from other forms of traffic
 Revitalisation and expansion of existing cycling trails
 Providing bike racks on buses, trams and trains
 The right for terminally ill people to choose voluntary assisted dying
 Repealing laws that prevent the territories from enacting voluntary assisted dying legislation
 Promote and support legalisation of voluntary assisted dying in every state and territory of Australia

Electoral history

Victorian state elections 

In addition to fielding candidates in a number of Victorian Legislative Assembly seats, the party stood candidates in all regions of the Victorian Legislative Council after 2017. In 2018 the party succeeded in re-electing Fiona Patten to the Northern Metropolitan Region.

Victorian state by-elections 

*Chipp was endorsed by the party, but the party was not registered with the VEC at the time, as they were in the process of changing their name.

Links
The party has had some involvement in Glenn Druery's Minor Party Alliance. However, in the lead-up to the 2018 state election, Fiona Patten had a falling out with Glenn Druery due to his new conflict of interest as chief-of-staff to Federal Senator, Derryn Hinch, who was running candidates in the election and receiving favourable preferences due to Druery's private business dealings as the "preference whisperer". She claimed that he demanded that the Reason Party pay him money, or she would not be re-elected. Patten made an official complaint to the VEC, and Druery is now subject to an ongoing police investigation over this complaint.

References

External links

 Reason Party official website of the Federal party
 Fiona Pattens Reason Party Victoria  official website of the Victoria party

2009 establishments in Australia
Political parties established in 2009
Sex Party
Sex Party
Censorship in Australia
Civil rights and liberties in Australia
Drug policy reform
Drugs in Australia
Euthanasia in Australia
Liberalism in Australia
Libertarianism in Australia
Progressive parties
Secularism in Australia
Sex industry in Australia
Sex positivism